Hewlett Neck is a village in the Town of Hempstead in Nassau County, on Long Island, in New York, United States. The population was 445 at the time of the 2010 census.

The Incorporated Village of Hewlett Neck is included in the Five Towns, which is usually said to comprise the villages of Lawrence and Cedarhurst, as well as the hamlets of Woodmere, Inwood, and "The Hewletts," which consist of the villages of Hewlett Bay Park, Hewlett Harbor, Hewlett Neck, and Woodsburgh, and the unincorporated hamlet of Hewlett.

History 
Hewlett Neck incorporated as a village on April 14, 1927.

Hewlett Neck consists of many large homes, mansions, villas and former plantations with very large property, a few dating back to the time of the American Revolution. The area, like Back/Old Lawrence, is unique because its rural affluence is similar in character to the more well known Gold Coast of the North Shore instead of being more urbanized like the rest of the South Shore of Nassau County.

Geography

Education

School district 
Hewlett Neck is located entirely within the boundaries of (and is thus served by) the Hewlett-Woodmere School District. As such, all children who reside within the village and attend public schools go to Hewlett-Woodmere's schools.

Library district 
Hewlett Neck is located entirely within the boundaries of (and is thus served by) the Hewlett-Woodmere Library District.

Demographics

As of the census of 2000, there were 504 people, 155 households, and 139 families residing in the village. The population density was 2,369.1 people per square mile (926.6/km2). There were 163 housing units at an average density of 766.2 per square mile (299.7/km2). The racial makeup of the village was 98.81% White, 0.79% African American, 0.20% Asian, 0.20% from other races. Hispanic or Latino of any race were 0.99% of the population.

There were 155 households, out of which 51.0% had children under the age of 18 living with them, 85.2% were married couples living together, 1.9% had a female householder with no husband present, and 10.3% were non-families. 8.4% of all households were made up of individuals, and 6.5% had someone living alone who was 65 years of age or older. The average household size was 3.25 and the average family size was 3.39.

In the village, the population was spread out, with 33.1% under the age of 18, 5.8% from 18 to 24, 21.8% from 25 to 44, 26.0% from 45 to 64, and 13.3% who were 65 years of age or older. The median age was 39 years. For every 100 females, there were 100.0 males. For every 100 females age 18 and over, there were 95.9 males.

The median income for a household in the village was $171,612, and the median income for a family was $181,530. Males had a median income of $100,000 versus $48,333 for females. The per capita income for the village was $88,049. None of the families and 1.2% of the population were living below the poverty line, including no under eighteens and 5.4% of those over 64.

References

External links 

 Official website

Five Towns
Villages in New York (state)
Villages in Nassau County, New York
Populated coastal places in New York (state)